Polyachyrus poeppigii is a species in the family Asteraceae that has segmented leaves.

References

Bibliography

Nassauvieae